FC Winterthur are a Swiss football team based in Winterthur. The 2014–15 season was their 118th season since their foundation in 1896. In this campaign they competed in two competitions, the 2014–15 Swiss Challenge League and the 2014–15 Swiss Cup. The club played their home games in the Stadion Schützenwiese.

Overview 
The club's chairman was Hannes W. Keller. It was his 14th and last season as club chairman and he was in office longer than any club president before him.

The first team played their home games in the Stadion Schützenwiese, which has been their home ground since the club's foundation. To match the Swiss Football League's license requirements introduced in the 2012/13 season, the stadium was modernized in three stages. The first stage contained improvements to the lighting, security, and catering systems, completed by 2013. This was followed by a rebuild of the eastern standing terrace in the second half of 2014 and early 2015. The capacity of the stadium for the 2014–15 season was reduced to approximately 5,000 spectators, due to this renovation. On Monday evening, 2 March 2015, for the championship match against FC Schaffhausen, the new eastern standing terraces ware officially inaugurated and taken into operation. The final renovation of the main stands was to take place 2016.

Pre-season
The most important issue in the preparation of the new season was only achieved two weeks before the start of the championship, although the change in the position of the head-coach had been announced some time in advance. After five years as boss, but because of the previous disappointing season, coach Boro Kuzmanovic had been dismissed. Jürgen Seeberger was hired a new coach. In his last job in Switzerland he led FC Schaffhausen from the third highest league to the Super League. His previous employer, SV Darmstadt 98, had separated themselves from him in December 2012.

On the transfer front it was soon clear that central defender Sead Hajrović, brother of Izet Hajrovic, would join the club coming from Grasshopper Club. Other important signings were João Paiva, who had been FC Wohlens' top scorer the previous season, center-back Dennis Iapichino, who had spent the previous two season in the Major League Soccer, by Montreal Impact and D.C. United and Marco Köfler from Kapfenberger SV. Furthermore Kristian Nushi joined from St. Gallen, Amin Tighazoui joined from Vaduz and Christian Fassnacht was signed from FC Tuggen.

The three most prominent departures were that of 33-year-old Sawas Exouzidis, who could no longer find a place in the team that Jürgen Seeberger had massively rejuvenated, Kristian Kuzmanovic, who left the club to play for Vaduz after his father had been fired, and Marco Aratore who transferred to St. Gallen in the top level of Swiss football.

First half of season
The first half of the season started for Winterthur on July 21, 2014 in the Schützenwiese with a home match against FC Wil. The 4–0 win against Wil was the beginning of a first good third of the championship for the club. By the end of September, six of ten games had been ended victorious and only three had ended in a defeat. Winterthur was in second position in the table at that time, five points behind the surprise leader FC Wohlen. Subsequently, however, the team slackened and only two more victories were achieved before the winter break in the remaining eight games. The gap to the top of the table grew to 9 points and the club over wintered in 4th position. The team were along way from being a promotion candidate. Despite everything, the preliminary round was stronger than the previous season and this left a good impression of the coach. In the individual criticism captain Patrick Bengondo emerged best, because he was involved in each second goal.

Second half of season
In the second half of the season, Winterthur did bot start as well as in the first half of the season. The first six games after the winter break were an up and down with three wins, two defeats and one draw. Then the team collapsed completely and managed just one single point in the following six games. This was the worst run of results that the club had achieved since the 2003–04 season. Although FCW was able to hold the fourth position in the table despite this victoryless phase, the gap to the leader increased from 11 to 33 points and they lost all contact to the extended top group. The 14 points achieved in the final six games didn't help to correct the effect of this slump either.

Winterthur finally finished the season with 53 points in 4th place, 21 points behind the division champions and promotion winners Lugano. In the end, Der Landbote reported a "decent season" for the FCW, but once again missed the "necessary winner mentality". What was remarkable about the 2014–15 season was the home strength and at the same time away weakness of the team. While they were the second-best team in the "home" table, four points behind newly promoted Lugano, on the other hand they were the second-worst team in the league "away" table, with just one point more than the bottom of the table Biel-Bienne. Servette did not obtain a license for the 2015-16 Challenge League season, due to the fact that they did not provide the necessary financial documents and guarantees. Servette was therefore relegated to the Promotion League. Because Servette had their license revoked Biel-Bienne escaped relegation.

Swiss Cup
Winterthur entered into the 2014–15 Swiss Cup on 23 August 2014 in an away game in the first round against lower tier FC Eschenbach. A tenth minute goal from youngster Mario Budimir put the team on the right track. However, Eschenbach equalised in the 68th minute and Winterthur had to increase the pace. Which they did and Tunahan Cicek and Amin Tighazoui both scored, so that the team could continue to the next round.

In the second round Winterthur were drawn at home to reigning Swiss Champions Basel. The match was played on 21 September in the Schützenwiese in front of a full capacity 5,050 spectators. After a short period of testing, in which the hosts kept up well, FCB took over dictation of the game. Mohamed Elneny brought his colors into the lead after half an hour with a remarkable drop kick from outside the penalty area. This was the start of a final phase of the first half in which the Basel team won the game. Breel Embolo scored twice before the break. After the break, he crowned his performance with his third personal goal, a beautiful lifting ball from a tight angle. This 4–0 also meant the final result. Basel's victory was deserved, but FC Winterthur also played a courageous game and would have deserved a goal for the good performance. The defense in front of Basel's goalkeeper Germano Vailati held things tight and so after the first half hour, there was no longer any doubt as to which of the two teams would reach the next round.

FC Basel continued as far as the final, but here they were beaten by FC Sion. This was the 13th cup win for FC Sion in their 13th final.

Players

Results

Swiss Challenge League

Matches

League standings

Swiss Cup

References

Sources
 Swiss Challenge League 2014–15 at RSSSF

External links
 Official website 
 "Bierkurve Winterthur" supporters club 
 "Laufpass" - Fanzine 
 Soccerway.com profile
 Football.ch profile 

Winterthur
FC Winterthur
FC Winterthur seasons